The 2022 NÖ Open was a professional tennis tournament played on clay courts. It was the second edition of the tournament which was part of the 2022 ATP Challenger Tour. It took place in Tulln an der Donau, Austria between 5 and 10 September 2022.

Singles main-draw entrants

Seeds

 1 Rankings are as of 29 August 2022.

Other entrants
The following players received wildcards into the singles main draw:
  Lucas Miedler
  Lukas Neumayer
  Joel Schwärzler

The following players received entry into the singles main draw as special exempts:
  Maxime Janvier
  Cedrik-Marcel Stebe

The following players received entry into the singles main draw using protected rankings:
  Sebastian Ofner
  Pedro Sousa

The following player received entry into the singles main draw as an alternate:
  Gerald Melzer

The following players received entry from the qualifying draw:
  Elmar Ejupovic
  Ivan Gakhov
  Benjamin Hassan
  Lukáš Klein
  Julian Lenz
  Jelle Sels

Champions

Singles

  Jozef Kovalík def.  Jelle Sels 7–6(8–6), 7–6(7–3).

Doubles

  Alexander Erler /  Lucas Miedler def.  Zdeněk Kolář /  Denys Molchanov 6–3, 6–4.

References

NÖ Open
2022 in Austrian sport
September 2022 sports events in Europe